Sweetland Township is a township in Muscatine County, Iowa, in the United States.

History
Sweetland Township was organized in 1842.

References

Townships in Muscatine County, Iowa
Townships in Iowa
1842 establishments in Iowa Territory